Ralph Klemme (born November 17, 1939) is an American politician, grain and livestock farmer.

Born in Plymouth County, Iowa, Klemme graduated from Le Mars, Iowa Community High School and served in the Iowa National Guard. Klemme was a grain and livestock farmer. He served on the Le Mars Community School Board. From 1993 to 2005, Klemme served in the Iowa House of Representatives and was a Republican.

References

1939 births
Living people
People from Plymouth County, Iowa
Farmers from Iowa
School board members in Iowa
Republican Party members of the Iowa House of Representatives